Dehesa de Campoamor is a village in the Orihuela Costa district in the municipality of Orihuela. It is located in the south of Alicante province and in the autonomous Valencian community, near the boundary with the Pilar de la Horadada.

In 2018, the population was estimated to be 857.

One notable feature of Dehesa de Campoamor is the pine forest located there.

External links 
 Dehesa de Campoamor
 Dehesa de Campoamor - Ayuntamiento de Orihuela: Ayuntamiento de Orihuela
 2 Dehesa de Campoamor

References 

Valencian Community
Populated places in the Province of Alicante